Luc is a French masculine given name and occasional a diminutive form of other names. Notable persons and characters with this name include:

 Luc Abalo (born 1984), French handball player
 Luc Arbogast (born 1975), French musician, singer, and songwriter
 Luc Berthold, Canadian politician
 Luc Besson (born 1959), French film director, screenwriter and producer
 Luc Blanchette, Canadian politician
 Luc Bradet (born 1969), Canadian pair skater
 Luc Carvounas (born 1971), French politician
 Luc Castaignos (born 1992), Dutch footballer
 Luc Dardenne (born 1954),  Belgian filmmaker
 Luc Donckerwolke (born 1965), Belgian car designer
 Luc Ducalcon (born 1984), French rugby union player
 Luc "Junior" Etou (born 1994), Congolese basketball player for Hapoel Be'er Sheva of the Israeli Basketball Premier League
 Luc Ferrari (1929–2005), French composer
 Luc Fortin, Canadian politician
 Luc Gnacadja (born 1958), Beninese politician and architect
 Luc Hoffmann (1923–2016), Swiss ornithologist, conservationist and philanthropist
 Luc Jacquet (born 1967), French film director
 Luc Jochimsen (born 1936), German politician
 Luc Longley (born 1969), Australian basketball player
 Luc Marquet (born 1970), French volleyball player
 Luc Adamo Matéta (born 1949), Congolese politician
 Luc Mbah a Moute (born 1986), Cameroonian basketball player
 Luc Montagnier (born 1932), French virologist
 Luc Nilis (born 1967), Belgian retired footballer
 Luc Nkulula (1985-2018), Congolese political activist
 Luc Picard (born 1961), French-Canadian actor, director and comedian
 Luc Robitaille (born 1966), Canadian ice hockey player and executive
 Luc Sala (born 1949), Dutch entrepreneur and writer
 Luc Tuymans (born 1958), Belgian painter

Fictional characters 
 Lucs Kohler, a fictional character in the anime Gundam SEED DESTINY
 Luc Teyssier, played by Kevin Kline in the 1995 romcom French Kiss
 Luc Deveraux, protagonist of the Universal Soldier film series, played Jean-Claude Van Damme
 Luc Laurent, in Brothers & Sisters
 Luc Mantear, The Wheel of Time series

See also
 Jean-Luc

French masculine given names
Hypocorisms